Riley Brockington (born November 13, 1975) is an Ottawa City Councillor for River Ward and former trustee of the Ottawa-Carleton District School Board.

Personal
Brockington grew up in the Riverside Park/Mooney's Bay neighbourhood of Ottawa's River Ward and attended public schools in the community. Following graduation from Brookfield High School in 1994, he attended the University of Ottawa where he obtained his degree in economics in 1998.
Brockington was married in 2001 and separated in 2013.  He is a single father of two daughters.

Career

Prior to being elected to city council, Brockington worked for 16 years at Statistics Canada.  He spent a number of years in the Education Division, managing a national education survey and publishing both pan-Canadian data and research papers on the same subject.  Later in his career, he took on two publications related to international travel statistics.

In addition to his work at Statistics Canada, Brockington was also on the board of the Canadian Association of Professional Employees, serving for two years as national vice-president and three years as chair of the finance committee.

From 2003 to 2010, Brockington served River Ward for two terms as the public school board trustee. During that time, he served in several capacities including Chair of the Business Services Committee, Budget Committee, and Vice-Chair of the Board.  In 2009, School Board Trustees from across Ontario elected Brockington the Vice-President of the Ontario Public School Boards Association.

Brockington was first elected to city council on October 27, 2014, and was sworn in on December 1, 2014.  On October 22, 2018, River Ward residents re-elected Brockington to serve until November 14, 2022.

During his second tenure, Brockington serves on the Planning Committee, Environment Committee, Transit Commission, Ottawa Public Library (COVID ad hoc committee and Fundraising Committee), Built Heritage Sub Committee, Association of Municipalities of Ontario (AMO) and Canadian Capital Cities Organization.

Brockington is considered a moderate on City Council, fiscally conservative, yet often championing social causes that reflects his diverse, urban ward.

References

Ottawa city councillors
1975 births
Living people
Ontario school board trustees
University of Ottawa alumni